Psyduck, known as  in Japan, is a Pokémon species in Nintendo and Game Freak's Pokémon franchise. Created by Ken Sugimori, Psyduck first appeared in the video games Pokémon Red and Blue and later in  sequels. They have later appeared in various merchandise, spinoff titles and animated and printed adaptations of the franchise. Psyduck is voiced by Rikako Aikawa in Japanese and Michael Haigney in English. A Psyduck also appears as part of the main cast in the live-action animated film Pokémon Detective Pikachu.

Known as the duck Pokémon, Psyduck is constantly stunned by its headache, and usually just stands vacantly, trying to calm itself. In the anime series, Psyduck's appearances became a running gag; Misty would often release Psyduck by accident instead of the Pokémon she wanted to use. Also, Misty's Psyduck has not evolved in the anime.

Design and characteristics
Psyduck was one of 151 different designs conceived by Game Freak's character development team and finalized by Ken Sugimori for the first generation of Pocket Monsters games Red and Green, which were localized outside Japan as Pokémon Red and Blue. Originally called "Koduck" in Japanese, Nintendo decided to give the various Pokémon species "clever and descriptive names" related to their appearance or features when translating the game for western audiences as a means to make the characters more relatable to American children. As a result, they were renamed "Psyduck", a combination of the words "psychic" and "duck".

Psyduck resembles a yellow duck with a vacant stare. It has a small tuft of black hair at the top of its head. It walks on its hind legs, and has arms rather than wings. Its arms are useful in using its powerful psychic abilities. Its appearance is meant to trick enemies into thinking it is weak. It has arms with three claws on each to deliver scratches if threatened. Psyduck live in freshwater lakes, small ponds, or rivers in tropical areas. When a Psyduck receives enough experience from battles, it evolves into Golduck, which appears to be based on the kappa.

Psyduck is constantly stunned by its headache, and usually just stands there vacantly, trying to calm its headache. When the headache gets too bad, its brain cells awaken, allowing it to use strong psychic powers. Some use their vacant look to their advantage, lulling the enemy and then using its psychokinetic powers. Psyduck do not remember using their powers, which they use while in a state of deep sleep, so they tilt their head in confusion. Psyduck is Pokémon developer Junichi Masuda's favorite Pokémon.

Appearances

In video games
Psyduck made its debut appearance in the Pokémon series in Pokémon Red and Blue. Psyduck also appears in other Pokémon games such as Pokémon Yellow, Pokémon Stadium, Pokémon Gold and Silver, Pokémon Crystal, Pokémon Stadium 2, Pokémon Ruby and Sapphire, Pokémon FireRed and LeafGreen, Pokémon Emerald, Pokémon Diamond and Pearl, Pokémon Platinum, Pokémon HeartGold and SoulSilver, Pokémon Black and White, Pokémon Black 2 and White 2, Pokémon X and Y, Pokémon Omega Ruby and Alpha Sapphire, Pokémon Sun and Moon, Pokémon Ultra Sun and Ultra Moon, Pokémon: Let's Go, Pikachu! and Let's Go, Eevee! and Pokémon Sword and Shield.

Outside of the main series, it appears in Pokémon Snap as a photographable Pokémon. It was available as a partner in Pokémon Mystery Dungeon: Adventure Team, which was released only in Japan.  It also appeared in Pokémon Pinball, Pokémon Channel, Pokémon Pinball: Ruby & Sapphire, Pokémon Trozei!, Pokémon Mystery Dungeon: Blue Rescue Team and Red Rescue Team, Pokémon Ranger, Pokémon Mystery Dungeon: Explorers of Time and Explorers of Darkness, Pokémon Mystery Dungeon: Explorers of Sky, Pokémon Rumble, PokéPark Wii: Pikachu's Adventure, Pokémon Rumble Blast, PokéPark 2: Wonders Beyond, Pokémon Rumble U, Pokémon Battle Trozei, Pokémon Shuffle, Pokémon Rumble World, Pokémon Picross, Pokémon Rumble Rush, Pokémon Mystery Dungeon: Rescue Team DX, Pokémon Go and New Pokémon Snap.

In other media
In the anime, Misty has a Psyduck that she accidentally caught in Hypno's Naptime. It is a constant source of frustration for her, as it frequently emerges to attempt to battle the opponent in substitution of the Pokémon she intends to use, and in instances where she does intend to use it, it will more often than not goof up (most notably in the episode "Snack Attack!"). Despite this, she has been shown to deeply care for it. Despite being generally shown as dimwitted and oblivious, when its headache gets bad enough, it has been shown to use phenomenally powerful Psychic-type moves which far exceed its perceived potential. It is also shown to be unable to swim, despite being a Water-type Pokémon. In a noteworthy episode, Misty rejoiced when she assumed her Psyduck has evolved into a stronger Golduck. This story was adapted into a book by Scholastic. Nine Psyduck appeared in "The Psyduck Stops Here!"; six parents and three babies. Three of the parents were blocking the path that Ash and his friends tried to pass on their way to Celestic Town. The Psyduck weren't able to return to their real home, Lake Psyduck, because of three Muk.

In the Pokémon Adventures manga, many Psyduck have appeared in the manga owned by other trainers. In the Red, Green & Blue chapter, an undead Psyduck, that had been brought back to life by a Koga's Gastly, appeared in the Pokémon Tower. It first appeared to Red like a normal Psyduck, until it attempted an assault on him: its eyeballs suddenly sunk into its eye sockets and some skin fell off, revealing its bones. Since it was just a mindless undead, it was easily destroyed by Red's Bulbasaur.

Psyduck appears in the 2019 film Pokémon Detective Pikachu as the partner to the female lead of the film, junior unpaid reporter Lucy Stevens (portrayed by Kathryn Newton).

Reception
Psyduck has appeared in multiple pieces of merchandise, including plush toys, battery-powered toys, pins, and cards in the Pokémon Trading Card Game. Zavvi has launched licensed T-shirts featuring Psyduck and other popular Generation I species. Psyduck-inspired cast necklaces have also been available in Japan. The first Pokémon Jet, a Boeing 747-400D for All Nippon Airways, has Psyduck and nine other Pokémon on its livery.

Described as "downright silly" by GameSpy, Psyduck has been well received by the media.  The New York Times compared it to a duck-billed platypus, adding that it "looks entertainingly silly". GameDaily described it as "one of the more unique Pokémon characters", as well as weird, noting it has changed little in either aspect throughout the history of the franchise. IGN described the character as a "cult favorite" amongst fans, attributing the reaction to its "bizarre, bewildered appearance", as well as citing it as a favorite character around their offices. GamesRadar also called it one of the more popular from the original games, describing it as fun to use "if only to see the reaction of other players". Jim Sterling of Destructoid included it in his list of 30 "rubbish" Pokémon, describing Psyduck as "One of the most annoying, irritating lumps of vomit ever invented." The Coventry Evening Telegraph also praised its design, stating the character was "more interesting" in comparison to more commonly seen Pokémon such as Squirtle. Author Loredana Lipperini described Psyduck as the "comic talents" of Nintendo. Kotaku's Patricia Hernandez cited Psyduck as an example of the better-quality Pokémon from the first generation due to its "endearing dopeyness." Author Cindy Jacobs suggested that Psyduck's powers were associated with the occult. She claimed that these telepathic powers were "actually demons that empower him." Pastor Phil Arms states, "Psyduck defeats his opponents by mesmerizing them with a piercing stare and releasing a barrage of pent-up mental energy. The New Age concept that parallels this ability falls under the heading of an altered state of consciousness." Liz Finnegan of The Escapist listed Psyduck as 45th of their favorite Pokemon, stating that "I liked Psyduck when it was just charmingly dopey." Syfy lauded Psyduck in Pokémon Detective Pikachu as the key Pokémon in the storyline.

See also

References

External links
 Psyduck on Bulbapedia
 Psyduck on Pokemon.com

Fictional ducks
Fictional monotremes
Fictional psychics
Pokémon species
Video game characters introduced in 1996
Video game characters with water abilities